Mumbles Pier railway station served the community of Mumbles, in the historical county of Glamorgan, Wales, from 1898 to 1959 on the Swansea and Mumbles Railway.

History
The station was opened on 10 May 1898 by the Swansea and Mumbles Railway. It closed on 12 October 1959.

References

Disused railway stations in Swansea
Railway stations in Great Britain opened in 1898
Railway stations in Great Britain closed in 1959
1898 establishments in Wales
1959 disestablishments in Wales